Fearon may refer to:

People
 Edward Fearon (1859–1933), Canadian politician and rancher
 George R. Fearon (1883–1976), President pro tem of the New York State Senate 1931–1932
 Henry Fearon (1802–1885), an English clergyman
 James Fearon (born c. 1963), American political scientist
 James S. Fearon (1849–1920), Chairman of the Shanghai Municipal Council
 Joel Fearon (born 1988), British sprinter and bobsledder
 John Turner Fearon (1869–1937), first editor of the Sunday Mercury
 Prof Kenneth Fearon (1960-2016), Scottish cancer specialist
Megan Fearon (born 1991), British politician
 Phil Fearon (born 1956), British record producer
 Ray Fearon (born 1967), British stage actor
 William Robert Fearon (1892–1959), Irish politician and academic

Other
 Fearon Publishers, a US publishing company based in Belmont, California
 R v Fearon, a Supreme Court of Canada case on warrantless search of cellphones
 Estadio Roy Fearon, a football (soccer) stadium in Puerto Barrios, Izabal, Guatemala

See also 
 Feron, a Marvel comics character
 Louise Féron, a French singer

English-language surnames